Jacob Austin  (born March 2, 1932) is a former Canadian politician and former member of the Senate of Canada. He was appointed to the upper house by Prime Minister Pierre Trudeau on August 8, 1975 and represented British Columbia. At the time of his retirement he was the longest-serving senator.

Life and career
Austin was born in Calgary, Alberta. Prior to entering the Senate, Austin had careers as a lawyer and then as a senior civil servant. In the 1950s, Austin was a legal partner of Nathan Nemetz who later served as Chief Justice of British Columbia. Nemetz recruited Austin to join the Liberal Party.

In the early 1960s, Austin's political career began when he served as executive assistant to Arthur Laing while he was Minister of Northern Affairs and National Resources. While in Ottawa he was asked by Paul Martin Sr. to serve on the legal team that negotiated the Columbia River Treaty on behalf of the government.

Austin's only attempt to win an election was as the Liberal candidate in Vancouver—Kingsway in the 1965 federal election but was defeated by Grace MacInnis of the New Democratic Party.

In 1970, he was appointed deputy minister of Energy, Mines and Resources and was part of the first Canadian trade mission sent to the People's Republic of China. He also played a key role in the establishment of Petro-Canada and Expo 86 in Vancouver.
 
He was appointed chief of staff to Prime Minister Pierre Trudeau in 1974 and was appointed to the Senate by Trudeau in 1975.  He served as a Minister of State in the cabinet of Prime Minister Pierre Trudeau from 1981 to 1982 and then Minister of State for Social Development until Trudeau's retirement in 1984. He returned to the Canadian Cabinet in 2003 when Prime Minister Paul Martin appointed him Leader of the Government in the Senate, where he served until the Liberal defeat in the 2006 election. He reached the age of 75 on March 2, 2007, and is retired from the senate.

He was given the Order of the Aztec Eagle by the Mexican Government in 2000. He was also inducted into the Order of British Columbia in 2010.

He has three daughters: Barbara, Edith and Sharon.

References

External links 
 Government of Canada Privy Council Office - Office of the Leader of the Government in the Senate
 

1932 births
Canadian senators from British Columbia
Jewish Canadian politicians
Candidates in the 1965 Canadian federal election
Liberal Party of Canada senators
Living people
Members of the Order of British Columbia
Members of the Order of Canada
Members of the King's Privy Council for Canada
Politicians from Calgary
Members of the 22nd Canadian Ministry
Members of the 27th Canadian Ministry
Liberal Party of Canada candidates for the Canadian House of Commons
20th-century Canadian politicians
21st-century Canadian politicians